Shar Mörön can refer to the following rivers in China:

 Shar Mörön, one of the headwaters of the Xiliao River, which in turn is one  of the headwaters of the Liao River in Manchuria.
 The Yellow River.